Elaphoglossum randii is a species of fern that grows only on the sub-Antarctic islands of Kerguelen and the Marion and Prince Edward Islands in the Indian Ocean.

References

Dryopteridaceae